The 2019 Midwestern Intercollegiate Volleyball Association Tournament was the men's volleyball tournament for the Midwestern Intercollegiate Volleyball Association held during the 2019 NCAA Division I & II men's volleyball season. It was held April 13 through April 20, 2019 at campus sites. The winner received the Association's automatic bid to the 2019 NCAA Volleyball Tournament.

Seeds
All eight teams are eligible for the postseason, with the highest seed hosting each round. Teams were seeded by record within the conference, with a tiebreaker system to seed teams with identical conference records.

Schedule and results

Bracket

References

Volleyball competitions in the United States
2019 NCAA Division I & II men's volleyball season